The 2014-15 Spartan South Midlands Football League season was the 18th in the history of Spartan South Midlands Football League, a football competition in England.

Premier Division

The Premier Division featured 19 clubs which competed in the division last season, along with three new clubs:

Kings Langley, promoted from Division One
Sun Postal Sports, promoted from Division One and changed name to Sun Sports
Wembley, transferred from Combined Counties Football League

League table

Results

Division One

Division One featured 21 clubs in the division for this season, of which there are four new clubs:

Bush Hill Rangers, joined from the Herts County League
Edgware Town, a newly formed club
Hatfield Town, relegated from the Premier Division
London Lions, relegated from the Premier Division

League table

Results

Division Two

Division Two featured 14 clubs which competed in the division last season, along with two new clubs:
Clean Slate, joined from the North Bucks & District League
Ealing Town, new club

League table

References

External links
 Spartan South Midlands Football League

2014-15
9